West Pittsburg may refer to:
 West Pittsburg, former name of Bay Point, California
 West Pittsburg, Pennsylvania
West Pittsburg station